The North-West University (NWU) is a public research university located on three campuses in Potchefstroom, Mahikeng and Vanderbijlpark in South Africa. The university came into existence through the merger of the Potchefstroom University for Christian Higher Education, which also had a branch in Vanderbijlpark, and the University of North-West (formerly the University of Bophuthatswana) in 2004. With its merged status, the North-West University became one of the largest universities in South Africa with the third largest student population (full-time and distance education) in the country.

The head offices of the university are located on the Potchefstroom campus.

In 2018, the North West University's Potchefstroom campus created a new worldwide usable model (by their researchers) to control the Fall Army Worm pest. The prototype does an accurate prediction of the worldwide spread of the worm. The researchers has also identified a natural process to deal with it, by using a parasitoid.

Campuses

Mahikeng Campus
Potchefstroom Campus
Vanderbijlpark Campus

Alumni
Dirk Hermann, trade unionist
Gerhard Mostert, rugby player
Warren Whiteley, rugby player
Katlego Maboe, television presenter
Demi-Leigh Nel-Peters, Miss Universe 2017
 Arrie Rautenbach, Group CEO of  Absa Group Limited since March 2022.
 Mamokgethi Phakeng, vice-chancellor of the University of Cape Town

Faculty 
'FACULTY OF HEALTH SCIENCE 'https://health-sciences.nwu.ac.za/
Executive Dean:  Prof Awie Kotze

RESEARCH

 Prof Jeanetta du Plessis, Deputy Dean, Research and Innovation, Faculty of Health Science https://health-sciences.nwu.ac.za/management/jeanetta-du-plessis 
 Prof Hanlie Moss, Research Director, PHASREC, Faculty of Health Science, https://health-sciences.nwu.ac.za/phasrec 
 Prof Petra Bester, Research Director, AUTHeR, Faculty of Health Science  https://health-sciences.nwu.ac.za/auther  Marié P. Wissing, professor at the Africa Unit for Transdisciplinary Health Research 
 Prof Johan du Plessis, Research Director, OHHRI, Faculty of Health Science, https://health-sciences.nwu.ac.za/ohhri 
 Prof Retha Bloem, Research Director, COMPRES, https://health-sciences.nwu.ac.za/compres

Chancellor

Leruo Molotlegi, 2004-2019
Anna Mokgokong, 2019-

References

External links 

North-West University

 

 
Universities in North West (South African province)
Public universities in South Africa
Educational institutions established in 2004
Potchefstroom
Mahikeng
Business schools in South Africa
2004 establishments in South Africa